Defending champion Novak Djokovic defeated Roger Federer in a rematch of the previous year's final, 6–3, 6–7(5–7), 6–2, to win the men's singles tennis title at the 2015 Indian Wells Masters.

Seeds
All seeds received a bye into the second round.

  Novak Djokovic (champion)
  Roger Federer (final)
  Rafael Nadal (quarterfinals)
  Andy Murray (semifinals)
  Kei Nishikori (fourth round)
  Milos Raonic (semifinals)
  Stan Wawrinka (second round)
  David Ferrer (third round)
  Tomáš Berdych (quarterfinals)
  Marin Čilić (second round)
  Grigor Dimitrov (third round)
  Feliciano López (quarterfinals)
  Gilles Simon (fourth round)
  Ernests Gulbis (third round)
  Roberto Bautista Agut (third round)
  Kevin Anderson (third round)
  Tommy Robredo (fourth round)
  John Isner (fourth round)
  Fabio Fognini (second round)
  Pablo Cuevas (third round)
  Ivo Karlović (second round)
  Richard Gasquet (second round, retired)
  Guillermo García López (second round)
  Leonardo Mayer (withdrew)
  Julien Benneteau (second round)
  Philipp Kohlschreiber (third round)
  Lukáš Rosol (fourth round)
  Fernando Verdasco (third round)
  Santiago Giraldo (second round)
  Andreas Seppi (third round)
  Jérémy Chardy (second round)
  Bernard Tomic (quarterfinals, withdrew because of a back injury)
  Gilles Müller (second round)

Draw

Finals

Top half

Section 1

Section 2

Section 3

Section 4

Bottom half

Section 5

Section 6

Section 7

Section 8

Qualifying

Seeds

Qualifiers

Lucky loser
  Daniel Gimeno Traver

Qualifying draw

First qualifier

Second qualifier

Third qualifier

Fourth qualifier

Fifth qualifier

Sixth qualifier

Seventh qualifier

Eighth qualifier

Ninth qualifier

Tenth qualifier

Eleventh qualifier

Twelfth qualifier

References
Main Draw
Qualifying Draw

BNP Paribas Open - Singles
Men's Singles